Communication and Works Department is a department of Government of Punjab, Pakistan. The Department is responsible for planning, execution, development and maintenance of all Roads and Bridges in province of Punjab.

Highways Department
Highways department is attached to Communication and Works Department. Punjab Highways Department is responsible for construction and maintenance of all the provincial roads network. The department maintains a network of over 38000 km of roads.

Road Research & Material Testing Institute
Established in 1944 Road Research and Material Testing Institute provides technical support in the shape of pavement design, testing and analysis of road construction materials, evaluation of existing pavements and providing solutions to various problems facing the field engineers of the Department.

Architecture Department
Architecture Department, an attached department of the Communication & Works Department. The department provides architectural services to various departments of the Punjab Government. It is mainly concerned with planning, designing and supervision of architectural aspects of all the Government sponsored projects.

Buildings Department
Functions of Building Department is Designing and construction of Buildings for various Government Departments and repair and maintenance of government buildings.

Building Research Station
Established in 1944 Building Research Station serves as material testing laboratory.

Autonomous Bodies

Punjab Ring Road Authority
PRRA is responsible for maintenance and upkeep of Lahore Ring Road.

Punjab Ring Road Authority
The LRRA may change its name to Punjab Ring Road Authority to increase its scope to undertake similar interventions across the province.

See also 
 Ministry of Communications
 Transport in Pakistan

References

Transport in Punjab, Pakistan
Departments of Government of Punjab, Pakistan